Bir is a 2020 Bangladeshi political action-drama film written and directed by Kazi Hayat. It features Shakib Khan and Shabnom Bubly in the lead roles. It is co-produced by Shakib Khan and Mohammad Iqbal under the banner of SK Films.

Principal photography began on 15 July 2019, and wrapped up in January 2020. The film was released on 14 February 2020 on the occasion of Valentine's Day.

Plot

Cast 
 Shakib Khan as Antu aka Bir
 Shabnom Bubly as Helena
 Hridoy Islam as Abir
 Misha Sawdagor as Dilu Bepari
 Nana Shah as Abul Kalam Munshi aka Khuinna Kalam
 Sadek Bacchu
 Shabnam Parvin
 Shiba Shanu
 Kazi Hayat as Sazzad Chowdhury (Special Appearance)

Production 
Shakib Khan was contracted for the film Bir on September 26, 2018, when Mohammad Iqbal was supposed to produce the film. Later, succession of Hero: The Superstar in 2014 and Password in 2019, On 23 June 2019 Shakib Khan announced the production of four films together with Bir from his own production company SK Films.

The film marked the 50th directorial venture of Kazi Hayat and first collaboration between Shakib Khan and Kazi Hayat. The film is dedicated to father of the nation Bangabandhu Sheikh Mujibur Rahman.

Casting 
On 2018 September 27, the lead actor and producer of the film Shakib Khan signed a contract for the "Bir" character of the film. On 2018, after the announcement of film making it was reported from the production company and producer that Shabnam Bubly will be acting in the film. Due to no formal announcement at the time many media reported that Shabnom Bubly is not staying in the film. After that on 15 July 2019 Shabnom Bubly officially contracted sign for the film.

On 2019 August 24, Ariana Zaman was contracted for a role in the films, it is also her debut film.

Filming 
Though the shooting of Bir was scheduled to begin on 2019 January 10, the shooting of the film was halted due to the illness of director Kazi Hayat. On 15 July, Muhurat of the film was held at the Shruti Studio in Dhaka. Then, on the same day, the official filming of the film began at BFDC. The first phase depicts scenes of Shakib Khan and his friend's childhood and father, three days drawn till July 18. Shakib Khan's character name is Antu and his friend's character is Miran. After that, the lead actor of the film Shakib Khan was out of the shooting for almost one and a half month to create the perfect look for the movie. After this, again the filming of it gets stuck. Later, he participated in the second phase of filming in Pubail at Dhaka on November 28 of this year. Then, on December 2, Shabnom Bubly participated in the filming. The second phase of filming participated Shakib Khan, Shabnom Bubly, Misha Sawdagor and other artists. Later, on December 7, filming of the climax and action scene began.

On 2019 December 25 Shakib Khan was admitted to the LabAid Hospital in Dhaka due to cold fever and gastric problems, then the film was stopped.

The film was complete with patchwork on January 26, 2020.

Soundtrack 

The film soundtrack is composed Shawkat Ali Emon, Akassh and Ahmed Sagir, while background score are composed by Emon Saha. A total of four songs have been used in the film, Imran Mahmudul and Konal have sung the first song, title is Tumi Amar Jibon. It is composed by Akassh and lyrics by Kabir Bakul. Habib Rahman also choreographed of the song. The title of the song Tumi Amar Jibon is taken from the song Tumi Amar Jibon by Jafar Iqbal and Babita's Abujh Hridoy by Ahmed Imtiaz Bulbul Tune and lyrics and sung by Andrew Kishore and Runa Laila. The song was released on Shakib Khan's official YouTube channel SK Films on February 7, 2020. the second song of the film Toke Dekhle Shudhu Ekti Bar was released on February 11, the song sung by Akash Mahmood. It is composed by Shawkat Ali Emon and lyrics by Faisal Rabbikin. Then on the same day released its third song; The item song titled is Miss Bubly, sung by Somnur Monir Konal. The music of this song is composed by Akassh and lyrics written by Priyo Chattopadhyay. It also used a poetic song titled Ki Chomotkar Dekha Gelo, sung by Monir Khan. The song composed by Ahmed Sagir and lyrics written by Munshi Wadud. On February 12, the song was released on YouTube channel of SK Films.

Marketing and release 
On February 12, 2020, production house of the film SK Films, hosted a talk show at the Samson Hall of Dhaka Club for the occasion of release of the film. State Minister of Information Murad Hasan, film personalities including actors Faruk, Alamgir were present on the occasion.

The film was released on February 14, 2020, on the occasion of Valentine's Day in 80 theatres all over the country.

Controversy 
After the release of the film's first look poster, many criticized it as imitation of the poster K.G.F: Chapter 1. Many have criticized Shakib Khan not just for the film first look poster copy, but also for his look as imitation of Yash of the film K.G.F: Chapter 1. Many have feared that the film Bir would have been made by KGF: Chapter 1. About this, director of the film Kazi Hayat denied it and said "This is a completely original story movie. The story is patriotic. Here is how a young man subjected to dirty politics. No domestic and foreign stories are in common with this." About this, its lead actor Shakib Khan said, "There are two types of films (K.G.F Chapter 1 and Bir). There is no similarity between these two films. It's a completely original story film."

References

External links 
 
 Bir (film) on Facebook
 

2020s Bengali-language films
Bengali-language Bangladeshi films
Political action films
2020 action drama films
Bangladeshi action drama films
Films about social issues in Bangladesh
Films scored by Shawkat Ali Emon
Films scored by Akassh